Leandro Pereira do Nascimento Lo (11 May 1989 – 7 August 2022), better known as Leandro Lo, was a Brazilian jiu-jitsu black belt competitor. A record holder with eight IBJJF world championship titles in five different weight classes, as well as multiple wins at every major international tournament, Lo is considered one of the most accomplished jiu-jitsu competitors of all time.

Born in São Paulo, Lo began training Brazilian jiu-jitsu (BJJ) at fourteen, after joining a social jiu-jitsu training program for underprivileged children. In 2005 he won his first world championship, competing as a blue belt. In 2010 his coach Cicero Costha promoted him to black belt. During the 2011–12 season Lo won medals at two no-gi championships, and his first black belt IBJJF world, Pan Am and UAEJJF World Pro titles. In 2015, he established his own jiu-jitsu team, NS Brotherhood.

In 2016 Lo became the first Copa Pódio triple crown champion, winning three different weight divisions within the same year; three years later in 2019, he made history after winning the World Championships in five different weight classes. In June 2022 Lo won an eighth world championship, exactly ten years after his first title as black belt. Lo was shot and killed in August 2022 at the age of 33.

Early life 
Leandro Pereira do Nascimento Lo was born on 11 May 1989 on the east side of São Paulo, Brazil. He started practising Brazilian jiu-jitsu (BJJ) at the age of 14, after joining a program for low-income children and adolescents, set up by Jiu-Jitsu instructor and coach Cicero Costha, called  or PSLPB (Social Project Fighting for Good ).

As a blue belt, Lo won his first IBJJF world championship in 2005, competing as a lightweight under team Barbosa JJ, winning silver the following year, and bronze at the 2006 Brazilian National Championship competing as a featherweight. As a purple belt, Lo won silver at the 2006 World Championship but suffered a serious injury that kept him from most tournaments, using that time to heal and refine his technique, Lo then won silver at the 2008 CBJJE Brazilian Cup. Lo received all his belts from Costha's hands, and in July 2010, was promoted to black belt.

Black belt career

2011–14: Brazilian champion, Copa Podio winning streak, first UAEJJF and IBJJF titles 
Fighting at lightweight (under ), Lo won the 2011 CBJJ Rio International Open, coming third in Absolute, and won the Brazilian Nationals. That same year Lo won the 2011 Abu Dhabi World Pro defeating Michael Langhi, who at the time was unbeaten in the lightweight division for three consecutive years, and Celso Vinicius one of the best jiu-jitsu lightweight competitor at the time. Competing in No-Gi Lo became  two-time Brazilian National No-Gi champion after winning gold for two consecutive years in three divisions; in 2012 Lo won silver in Absolute at the 2012 IBJJF World No-Gi Championship, losing the final to Xande Ribeiro via advantage.

In 2012 he won another Brazilian Nationals title, the Pan American championship. and that same year, Lo won his first black belt world title becoming the 2012 lightweight world champion after beating Lucas Lepri in the final. Lo won again the 2013 World lightweight division the following year. Lo held an unbeaten winning streak at the Copa Podio Grand Prix from 2011 to 2013, one of the biggest professional jiu-jitsu events in Brazil, winning the 2013 edition in Rio de Janeiro after submitting UFC welterweight Gilbert Burns in an epic 20 minutes match. Until then a two-time lightweight world champion and already considered the best lightweight in the world, Lo won double gold (both weight and absolute) at the 2013  CBJJ Rio International Open, competing as middleweight alongside his partner at the time, Luiza Monteiro who also won double gold.

Lo entered the 2014 World Championship moving up a weight class to middleweight (under ). After defeating Otavio Sousa Lo became the 2014 middleweight world champion, also winning Pan Am and Abu Dhabi Pro that year.

2015–17: Copa Podio triple crown, IBJJF double grand slam 
In 2015, Lo left PSLPB to form his own team NS Brotherhood (Jiu-Jitsu New School Brotherhood ) taking with him several fellow competitors. That same year Lo defeated Lucas Lepri in Rio de Janeiro for the GP lightweight title, becoming Copa Podio champion for the fourth time. Going up a weight class again to medium heavyweight (under ), Lo won the 2015 World (his fourth title in a row), the Pan Am and the Abu Dhabi Pro tournaments.

In October 2016, Lo made history by becoming the first ever Copa Podio triple crown champion: winning three consecutive Grand Prix titles in three separate weight classes: Lightweight, Middleweight and Heavyweight, all in the same year; a performance never before accomplished in the sport of jiu-jitsu. Lo won the last heavyweight title without conceding a single point. In addition to the three Copa Podio Grand Prix, Lo won the IBJJF World and Pan championships as well as the UAEJJF World Pro that year.

In 2017 Lo went again up another weight class by entering the IBJJF tournaments at heavyweight (under ), that year he won silver in absolute and silver in heavyweight at the world championship, after losing to Nicholas Meregali in the final. Lo then won double gold at Pan after defeating ultra heavyweight João Gabriel Rocha in the open weight final. Lo also won double gold at the Brazilian Nationals and double gold at the European Championship, where he competed for the first time, after submitting Tanner Rice in the heavyweight final and Claudio Calasans by points (4-0) in the open weight final.

During the ADCC North American West Coast Trials, held in Anaheim California on 15 April 2017, Lo defeated Gordon Ryan in a Superfight by 4×0 pts. Invited to the 2017 ADCC World Championships in Espoo, Finland, competing for the first time for the - title, Lo was eliminated in the first round by Asia and Oceania Trials winner Craig Jones. After achieving a double Grand Slam, gold medals in weight and absolute divisions in the four main IBJJF tournaments: Euros, Pans, Brazilian Nationals and Worlds, Lo placed #1 in the IBJJF 2016–2017 ranking,

2018–20: Eighth Pan Am and record IBJJF World titles 
Lo became two-time Absolute Pan Champion, after winning the heavyweight and absolute divisions at the 2018 tournament taking place in March in Irvine, California. Lo defeated Tanner Rice in the heavyweight finals and Gutemberg Pereira in the finals of the Absolute division, furthering his record to eight Pan titles.

In May 2018 Lo entered the world championship as super-heavyweight (under ) but dislocated his shoulder twice during the super-heavyweight final and was unable to continue; in a surprising move, his close friend Marcus Buchecha, who he was supposed to face in the Absolute final, forfeited his match to give Lo the 2018 open weight title, the only title missing in his career. In November Lo announced that he was stepping down from his role as NS Brotherhood head coach, to focus on competition and on his career.

Lo went back to heavyweight at the 2019 World Championship, winning silver after losing to Kaynan Duarte in the final. Competing for the open weight title, Lo defeated Keenan Cornelius in the semi-final but made the final a close out when he gave Buchecha the victory, returning the previous year favour. However, after Kaynan Duarte was stripped of his victory for failing a USADA Test, Lo was crowned world heavyweight champion, making him a record world champion in 5 different weight classes, thus dethroning the record held for 20 years by Saulo Ribeiro. On September 6, 2020, Lo competed against Nicholas Meregali at BJJ Bet, fighting him to a draw. He was then invited to compete in the middleweight grand prix at BJJ Stars 4 on November 14, 2020. Lo defeated three opponents on points and managed to win the tournament.

2021–22: Eighth and last IBJJF World title 
Returning at medium-heavyweight for the first time since 2016, training at Unity Jiu Jitsu in New York, Lo won bronze at the 2021 World Championship and at the 2022 Pan Jiu-Jitsu Championship; he then became the 2022 World Jiu-Jitsu Champion after defeating Isaque Bahiense in the medium heavyweight final; winning his eighth and last world championship title, an accomplishment only reached at the time by three others in IBJJF history. That last title placed him at number 1 in the medium-heavy male gi division for the 2021–2022 season of the International Brazilian Jiu-Jitsu Federation Ranking.

Lo was booked to compete against Alex Munis in the main event of BJJ Stars 5 on February 6, 2021. Lo submitted Munis with a collar choke to win the match. He then competed in the main event of Big Deal Pro 3 on July 11, 2021 against Henrique Ceconi and defeated him by advantages. Lo was then invited to compete in the no gi grand prix at BJJ Bet 2 on August 1, 2021. Lo won his first two matches against Rafael Paganini and William Tackett but was submitted by Lucas 'Hulk' Barbosa by rear-naked choke in the final.

Recognition 
His guard technique earned Lo recognition as one of the "best pound for pound grapplers to have ever graced the mat." According to top coach John Danaher, Lo was "unquestionably one of the greatest Jiu-jitsu athletes of his generation and indeed in the history of the sport". The International Brazilian Jiu-Jitsu Federation called Lo "one of the greatest athletes our sport has ever produced" and "an example of a true black belt, martial artist and champion on and off the mats".

Brazilian jiu-jitsu competitive summary

Main achievements as black belt 
Achievements at major competitions:

 8 × IBJJF World Champion (2012 / 2013 / 2014 / 2015 / 2016 / 2018 / 2019 / 2022)
 8 × IBJJF Pans Champion(2012 / 2014 / 2015 / 2016 / 2017 / 2018)
 5 × UAEJJF Abu Dhabi Pro Champion (2011 / 2013 / 2014 / 2015 / 2016)
 IBJJF European Open Champion (2017)
 BJJ Stars Middleweight Grand Prix Champion (2020)
 4 × CBJJ Brazilian Nationals Champion (2011 / 2012 / 2017)
 3 × CBJJ Brazilian Nationals No-Gi Champion (2011 / 2012)
 4 × Copa Podio Lightweight Grand Prix Champion (2011 / 2013 / 2014 / 2016)
 2 × Copa Podio Middleweight Grand Prix Champion (2012 / 2016)
 Copa Podio Heavyweight Grand Prix Champion (2016)
 CBJJ Rio International Open Champion (2011 / 2013)
 2nd place Copa Podio Heavyweight GP (2014)
 2nd place IBJJF World Championship (2017 / 2018 / 2019)
 2nd place IBJJF World No-Gi Championship (2012)
 2nd place IBJJF Pans Championship (2016 / 2014)
 3rd place IBJJF World Championship (2015 / 2021)
 3rd place IBJJF World No-Gi Championship (2012)
 3rd place CBJJ Rio International Open Champion (2011)

Main achievements in coloured belts 
Achievements at major competitions:

 IBJJF World Champion (2005 junior blue)
 2 × CBJJ Brazilian National Champion (2009 / 2010 brown)
 CBJJE Brazilian Cup Champion (2008 purple)
 2nd place IBJJF World Championship (2006 junior blue)
 2nd place CBJJ Brazilian Nationals (2008 purple)
 3rd place CBJJE Brazilian Cup Champion (2006 blue)

Instructor lineage 
Carlos Gracie > Helio Gracie > Rickson Gracie > Marcelo Behring > Waldomiro Perez > Roberto Godoi > Marco Barbosa > Cicero Costha > Leandro Lo

Fight history

Death and aftermath 
In the early morning hours of 7 August 2022 at a São Paulo nightclub, Lo was shot  in the head following an altercation. Lo was taken to hospital where he was declared brain dead. The alleged shooter, a police officer, was arrested the next evening after turning himself in. 

Lo's funeral took place on 9 August 2022 at Morumbi Cemetery in São Paulo. Lo's fellow athletes, many wearing their Jiu-Jitsu Gi, lined the way from the chapel to the cemetery in a guard of honour, while his body was being carried in an open coffin.

The initial hearing for Lo's murder trial was scheduled for February 3, 2023. The day before the initial hearing was due to take place, it was postponed to March 24, 2023.

Explanatory notes

References

External links 
Leandro Lo: Quest for the Triple Crown
The Unparalleled Friendship Of Buchecha & Leandro Lo

1989 births
2022 deaths
20th-century Brazilian people
21st-century Brazilian people
Brazilian practitioners of Brazilian jiu-jitsu
Brazilian submission wrestlers
Deaths by firearm in Brazil
People awarded a black belt in Brazilian jiu-jitsu
Sportspeople from São Paulo
World Brazilian Jiu-Jitsu Championship medalists
World No-Gi Brazilian Jiu-Jitsu Championship medalists